Gjebrea is an Albanian surname. Notable people with the surname include:

Ardit Gjebrea (born 1963), Albanian singer-songwriter, producer, and television presenter
Ramize Gjebrea (1923–1944), Albanian World War II partisan

Albanian-language surnames